NORC may refer to:

Organizations 
 NORC (web service), a street view web service and company based in Romania
 Guerrilla Army of the Poor, which went by the acronym NORC in its beginnings
 National Opinion Research Center (NORC) at the University of Chicago

Places
 Naturally occurring retirement community
 Northern Rim Countries (Canada, Denmark, Iceland, Norway, Russia and the United States, sometimes including Finland and Sweden)

Science and technology
 norC, gene coding for the small subunit of nitric oxide reductase
 IBM NORC (Naval Ordnance Research Calculator) computer